The Division of Oxley was an Australian electoral division in the state of Queensland. It was located in the inner southern suburbs of Brisbane, and originally included the suburbs of South Brisbane, Woolloongabba and Coorparoo. By the time it was abolished in 1934, it had been redistributed to cover suburbs such as Bulimba and Murarrie.

The division was proclaimed in 1900, and was one of the original 65 divisions to be contested at the first federal election. It was named after explorer John Oxley. The Division was abolished and replaced by the Division of Griffith at the redistribution of 1 August 1934. At the redistribution of 11 May 1949, a new Division of Oxley was created in the south-western suburbs of Brisbane, primarily around Ipswich.

Members

Election results

References 

1901 establishments in Australia
Constituencies established in 1901
Former electoral divisions of Australia
Federal politics in Queensland
Constituencies disestablished in 1934
1934 disestablishments in Australia